Marko Ivanovich Voinovich (1750–1807) was an Admiral of the Russian Imperial Navy, one of the founders of the Black Sea Fleet.

Life
Vojnović was born in Herceg Novi, Republic of Venice (now Montenegro). He was a member of the Vojnović noble family, a Serb family recognized as nobility by Venice and Trieste in the Habsburg monarchy, and  Imperial Russia.

In 1770 Vojnović was accepted into the Russian Navy as an ensign and saw distinguished service in the Mediterranean expedition of Russian Navy during the Russo-Turkish War (1768–1774).

In 1780 Vojnović was appointed the Commander of the Caspian Flotilla He led an expedition to the Caspian Sea in 1781 and discovered offshore oil and gas deposits near Chilov Island.

In 1783 Vojnović was appointed the commander of the first battleship of the nascent Black Sea Fleet. In 1785 he became the commander of Sevastopol Squadron. He fought in the Black Sea against the Turkish Navy led by Hassan Pasha in 1788. From the end of 1789 to the beginning 1790 Vojnović was the Chief of the Black Sea Fleet. Although the Russian Navy won the Battle of Fidonisi under his command, his actions in the Russo-Turkish War (1787–1792) were considered indecisive and he was dismissed from command of the Fleet in March 1790.

In 1797 Vojnović became a member of the Black Sea Admiralty Administration. He was appointed a full Admiral in 1801 and retired in 1805.

See also
 Ivan Adamovich
 Matija Zmajević
 Sava Vladislavich
 Semyon Zorich
 Peter Tekeli
 Georgi Emmanuel
 Simeon Piščević
 Jovan Albanez
 Simeon Končarević
 Jovan Šević
 Mikhail Miloradovich
 Anto Gvozdenović
 Ilya Duka
 Dmitry Horvat
 Marko Ivelich
 Nikolai Dimitrievich Dabić
 Nikolai Kuznetsov (admiral)

References

Sources

18th-century people from the Russian Empire
1750 births
1807 deaths
18th-century Serbian nobility
Imperial Russian Navy admirals
Explorers from the Russian Empire
Recipients of the Order of St. George of the Third Degree
People from the Russian Empire of Serbian descent
Marko
Republic of Venice nobility
Emigrants from the Republic of Venice to the Russian Empire